HMB-45 is a monoclonal antibody that reacts against an antigen present in melanocytic tumors such as melanomas, and stands for Human Melanoma Black. It is used in anatomic pathology as a marker for such tumors. The specific antigen recognized by HMB-45 is now known as Pmel 17.

History
HMB-45 was discovered by Drs. Allen M. Gown and Arthur M. Vogel in 1986.  The antibody was generated to an extract of melanoma.

Cancer diagnostics
In a study to determine diagnostic usefulness of specific antibodies used to identify melanoma, HMB-45 had a 92% sensitivity when used to identify melanoma.  The antibody also reacts positively against junctional nevus cells and fetal melanocytes.

Despite this relatively high sensitivity—HMB-45 does have its drawbacks. HMB-45 can be detected in only 50-70% of melanomas. HMB-45 does not react well against intradermal nevi, normal adult melanocytes, spindle cell melanomas and desmoplastic melanomas. HMB-45 is nonreactive with almost all non-melanoma human malignancies, with the exception of rare tumors showing evidence of melanogenesis (e.g., pigmented schwannoma, clear cell sarcoma) or tumors associated with tuberous sclerosis complex (angiomyolipoma and lymphangiomyoma).

Storage
HMB-45 should be stored at 4 degree Celsius.  At 4 degrees Celsius the antibody will be stable for up to 2 months without any loss of quality.  For best results it should be used before the expiration date.

Alternatives
When conducting an immunocytochemical studies to identify melanoma for scientific or clinical studies, scientist and medical professionals can also use S-100, Melan-A, Tyrosinase, and Mitf to identify tumors.

See also 
 List of histologic stains that aid in diagnosis of cutaneous conditions

References

External links
Melanoma Marker (HMB45) Antibody - https://www.scbt.com
Melanoma antibody (ab787) datasheet - abcam.com.
Novus Biologicals HMB-45

Histopathology